The Thirty-First Wisconsin Legislature convened from  to  in regular session, and later re-convened from June 4 to June 7, 1878, in special session, to complete the revision of the statutes.  This was the first extra session of the Wisconsin Legislature since 1862.

This was the first and only session of the Legislature to have an Assembly speaker from the Greenback Party—Augustus Barrows.  Despite the Greenbackers holding only 13% of the Assembly seats, neither major party had enough seats to form a majority without Greenback support.  The Democrats thus formed a coalition with the Greenbacks for the 31st Legislature with Barrows acting as speaker.

Senators representing even-numbered districts were newly elected for this session and were serving the first year of a two-year term. Assembly members were elected to a one-year term. Assembly members and even-numbered senators were elected in the general election of November 6, 1877. Senators representing odd-numbered districts were serving the second year of their two-year term, having been elected in the general election held on November 7, 1876.

Major events
 January 7, 1878: Inauguration of William E. Smith as the 14th Governor of Wisconsin.
 February 7, 1878: Pope Pius IX died at the Apostolic Palace in Vatican City.
 February 28, 1878: The Bland–Allison Act became law in the United States, with the United States Congress overriding the veto of   The act restored the monetary status of silver coins, a key priority of the Free silver movement.
 March 3, 1878: Cardinal Vincenzo Gioacchino Raffaele Luigi Pecci was crowned Pope Leo XIII.
 March 3, 1878: The Treaty of San Stefano was signed, ending the Russo-Turkish War of 1877–1878 and establishing an independent Principality of Bulgaria.
 April 29, 1878:  signed the National Quarantine Act of 1878, which created regulations to prevent the introduction of contagious diseases into the United States.  The law also established the Marine Hospital Service, the forerunner of the United States Public Health Service Commissioned Corps and the National Institutes of Health.
 June 18, 1878:  signed the Posse Comitatus Act, which limited the power of the President to use the United States military to enforce domestic policies.
 July 13, 1878: The Treaty of Berlin (1878) was signed, making Serbia, Montenegro, and Romania completely independent from the Ottoman Empire, confirming the independence of Bulgaria, transferring Cyprus to British control, and allowing Austria-Hungary to garrison the Bosnia Vilayet.  The treaty settled regional issues left open by the Treaty of San Stefano.
 October 1, 1878: The United States Supreme Court decided the case Ex parte Jackson, extending Fourth Amendment protections to private letters and packages.

Major legislation
 February 12, 1878: Joint Resolution relating to the remonetization of silver, 1878 Joint Resolution 3.  Endorsed congressional action to restore the monetary value of silver currency, and resume minting silver coins.
 March 12, 1878: An Act to amend sections thirty-one and thirty-two of chapter fifty-six, of the general laws of 1870, entitled "An act to provide for the incorporation and government of fire and inland navigation insurance companies." 1878 Act 214. Created the appointed position of state insurance commissioner.
 March 21, 1878: An Act to authorize the granting of state certificates to graduates of the state university, 1878 Act 333.  Created a certification process to enable any graduate of the University of Wisconsin to become authorized to work as a teacher at any public school in Wisconsin.

Party summary

Senate summary

Assembly summary

Sessions
 1st Regular session: January 9, 1878March 21, 1878
 June Special session: June 4, 1878June 7, 1878

Leaders

Senate leadership
 President of the Senate: James M. Bingham (R)
 President pro tempore: Levi W. Barden (R)

Assembly leadership
 Speaker of the Assembly: Augustus Barrows (GB)

Members

Members of the Senate
Members of the Senate for the Thirty-First Wisconsin Legislature:

Members of the Assembly
Members of the Assembly for the Thirty-First Wisconsin Legislature:

Employees

Senate employees
 Chief Clerk: Andrew Jackson Turner until February 7, 1878, then Charles E. Bross
 Assistant Clerk: F. J. Stockwell
 Bookkeeper: I. F. Stickle
 Engrossing Clerk: J. W. Bates
 Enrolling Clerk: John W. DeGroff
 Sergeant-at-Arms: L. J. Brayton
 Assistant Sergeant-at-Arms: D. D. Polleys
 Postmaster: Fred Badger
 Assistant Postmaster: J. A. Neavill
 Gallery Attendant: George M. Laing
 Assistant Attendant: John Beck
 Committee Room Attendants: 
 William Reese
 W. A. Mills
 D. H. Pulcifer
 Doorkeepers: 
 R. B. Winsor
 W. F. Bingman
 G. W. McDougal
 L. L. Gunderson
 Porter: John Benson
 Night Watch: C. L. Smith
 Messengers: 
 Charles Marsden
 Welcome Smith
 George Buehner
 E. Hubbell
 Harry Meeker
 Louis Loper
 Prentiss S. Brannan
 Eddie Torrey
 P. L. Jerdee
 Lucien Pickarts
 Thomas Lucas

Assembly employees
 Chief Clerk: Jabez R. Hunter
 Assistant Clerk: Sam Ryan Jr.
 Bookkeeper: Roger C. Spooner
 Engrossing Clerk: Michael Bohan
 Asst. Engrossing Clerk: George Cox
 Enrolling Clerk: H. G. Fischbein
 Asst. Enrolling Clerk: John Meehan
 Proof Reader: Michael Walsh
 Sergeant-at-Arms: Anton Klaus
 Assistant Sergeant-at-Arms: M. J. Egan
 Assistant Sergeant-at-Arms: Hugh Lewis
 Postmaster: D. W. C. Wilson
 Assistant Postmaster: George W. Dart
 Assistant Postmaster: Anthony G. Froner
 Doorkeepers: 
 J. A. Allen
 Thomas Hobbins
 O. H. Hestehurn
 N. Sullivan
 Committee Room Attendants:
 Ed. Flaherty
 Anton Klaus Jr.
 Richard Donevan
 William Mahoney
 S. S. Hills
 Ed. Jannush
 Gallery Attendants:
 John Kane
 A. Tideman
 Porters: 
 B. Coyne
 Henry Ebert
 Night Watch: F. B. Brundage
 Night Watch: Francis Fitzgerald
 Fireman: George Burns
 Janitor: Peter Labonde
 Wash Room Attendant: James Whitty
 Messengers:
 Clinton Snow
 Charles Whitton
 Harry Cutler
 Willie Krueger
 Fred T. Lee
 Jas. Foran
 Herman Schum
 George Gewecke
 Robert Gilroy
 Marcus L. Moody
 William Burnett
 John Roberts
 Edward Cavanaugh
 Charles Klaus

References

External links
 1878: Related Documents from Wisconsin Legislature

1878 in Wisconsin
Wisconsin
Wisconsin legislative sessions